Sir William Fleetwood (156313 December 1630) was an English politician who sat in the House of Commons at various times between  1584 and 1628.

Fleetwood was the eldest son of William Fleetwood of Great Missenden, Buckinghamshire and his wife Marian Barley, daughter of John Barley of Kingsey, Buckinghamshire. He was admitted at Middle Temple in 1584 and was readmitted in 1592 after some dispute. In 1584, Fleetwood was elected Member of Parliament for Preston where his father was the recorder. In 1586 he was elected MP for Poole.

Fleetwood succeeded his father in 1594 to considerable estates, including the abbey of Great Missenden. He became J.P. for Berkshire and Buckinghamshire by 1597. He was surveyor of lands in north parts, Duchy of Lancaster in 1603 and was knighted in the same year. In 1604 he was elected MP for Buckinghamshire. He was elected MP for Buckinghamshire again in 1621 and was High Sheriff of Buckinghamshire for 1622–23. He was re-elected MP for Buckinghamshire in 1624 and again in 1628, and sat until 1629 when King Charles decided to rule without parliament for eleven years.

Fleetwood died at the age of 66 at Great Missenden and buried at Great Missenden parish church.

Fleetwood married Anne Barton, daughter of Ralph Barton of Smithills Hall, near Bolton, Lancashire, and had seven sons and seven daughters. His wife died in 1621.

References

 
 

1563 births
1630 deaths
Members of the Middle Temple
Politicians from Preston, Lancashire
High Sheriffs of Buckinghamshire
Place of birth missing
English MPs 1584–1585
English MPs 1586–1587
English MPs 1604–1611
English MPs 1621–1622
English MPs 1624–1625
English MPs 1628–1629